The Bion satellites, also named Biocosmos, is a series of Soviet (later Russian) biosatellites focused on space medicine.

Bion space program

Bion precursor flights and Bion flights 
The Soviet biosatellite program began in 1966 with Kosmos 110, and resumed in 1973 with Kosmos 605. Cooperation in space ventures between the Soviet Union and the United States was initiated in 1971, with the signing of the United States and Soviet Union in Science and Applications Agreement (which included an agreement on space research cooperation). The Soviet Union first offered to fly U.S. experiments on a Kosmos biosatellite in 1974, only a few years after the termination (in 1969) of the U.S. biosatellite program. The offer was realized in 1975 when the first joint U.S./Soviet research were carried out on the Kosmos 782 mission.

The Bion spacecraft were based on the Zenit spacecraft and launches began in 1973 with primary emphasis on the problems of radiation effects on human beings. Launches in the program included Kosmos 110, 605, 690, 782, plus Nauka modules flown on Zenit-2M reconnaissance satellites.  of equipment could be contained in the external Nauka module.

The Soviet/Russian Bion program provided U.S. investigators a platform for launching Fundamental Space Biology and biomedical experiments into space. The Bion program, which began in 1966, included a series of missions that flew biological experiments using primates, rodents, insects, cells, and plants on a biosatellite in near-earth orbit. NASA became involved in the program in 1975 and participated in 9 of the 11 Bion missions. NASA ended its participation in the program with the Bion No.11 mission launched in December 1996. The collaboration resulted in the flight of more than 100 U.S. experiments, one-half of all U.S. life sciences flight experiments accomplished with non-human subjects.

The missions ranged from five days (Bion 6) (Kosmos 1514) to around 22 days (Bion 1 and Kosmos 110).

Bion-M 
In 2005, the Bion program was resumed with three new satellites of the modified Bion-M type – the first flight was launched on 19 April 2013 from Baikonur Cosmodrome, Kazakhstan. The first satellite of the new series Bion-M1 featured an aquarium by the German Aerospace Center (DLR) and carried 45 mice, 18 Mongolian gerbils, 15 geckos, snails, fish and micro-organisms into orbit for 30 days before re-entry and recovery. All the gerbils died due to a hardware failure, but condition of the rest of the experiments, including all geckos, was satisfactory. Half the mice died as was predicted.

Bion-M2 is scheduled to launch in 2023 on a Soyuz 2.1a rocket to an altitude of 800 km. The orbiter will carry 75 mice and studies will focus on how they are affected at the molecular level by space radiation.

Launch history

See also 

 BIOPAN
 Biosatellite program
 EXPOSE
 Foton-M2
 Interkosmos
 List of Kosmos satellites
 List of microorganisms tested in outer space
 O/OREOS
 OREOcube
 Tanpopo
 Zond 5

References

External links 

 Zenit Satellites - Bion variant
 Astronautix, Bion
 TsSKB, Bion images (Russian)
 R. W. Ballard, and J. P. Connolly; U.S./U.S.S.R. joint research in space biology and medicine on Kosmos biosatellites, FASEB J. 4: 5-9  (Overview of Bion 1 to 9)

 
Satellites formerly orbiting Earth
Satellites of the Soviet Union
Satellites of Russia
Animals in space
Astrobiology space missions
Biosatellites
Animal testing in the Soviet Union